Conservative Member of Parliament Michael Colvin and his wife died in a fire at their home on 24 February 2000. This created a by-election in his constituency of Romsey in Hampshire, England.

The Conservative Party decided to delay the polling day until 4 May, so that it would come simultaneously with local elections. They selected Tim Palmer, a farmer and Dorset County Councillor, to defend the seat. The Liberal Democrats considered this byelection their best chance of gaining a seat since 1997 and selected a local pharmacist Sandra Gidley (who had been Mayor of Romsey) as their candidate.

Labour carried out minimal campaigning in a constituency in which they had come third for years. This led many observers to assume that the party was expecting, or hoping, that its vote would largely go to the Liberal Democrats in order to help defeat the Conservatives. In the event, the Labour vote collapsed while the Liberal Democrats surged, and they made this the only mainland by-election to result in a change of party control in the entire Parliament. This was the first time the Conservatives had lost a seat in a by-election while in Opposition since the 1965 Roxburgh, Selkirk and Peebles by-election, and would be the last time the Liberal Democrats gained a constituency from the Conservatives at a by-election until the 2016 Richmond Park by-election.

Results

1997 general election result

References

External links
Campaign literature from the by-election

2000 elections in the United Kingdom
2000 in England
By-elections to the Parliament of the United Kingdom in Hampshire constituencies
Test Valley
2000s in Hampshire